Global Underground 022: Dave Seaman, Melbourne is a 2002 DJ mix album in the Global Underground series, compiled and mixed by Dave Seaman.  The album peaked at #8 on the Billboard Top Electronic Albums chart.

GU returns Down Under as Dave Seaman mans the controls. As one of the original international superstars to build a reputation for himself in Australia, it was fitting that this mix was put together around one of his regular visits there.

As one of GU's most prolific DJs (this is his third outing for the City series), the deeper, darker sound explored on 022 was not to the tastes of some fans of his previous discs on the famously unforgiving GU Forum, but equally confirmed his status as one of the most talented, exciting jocks in the world to many others.

Track listing

Disc one
Our House - Soliton Wave (Slow Mix) – 6:59
Urban Dwellers - Loverman (Satoshi Tomiie Ambient Mix) – 2:11
Jono Fernandez - Intruder – 2:15
Howie B. - Making Love on Your Side (S-Man's Gypsy Remix) – 3:46
James Holden - One For You (Avus' One For The DJs Squelchapella) – 3:46
Digital Mind Control - Mindstate – 7:03
Ming Moods Vol. 1 - Haunting Theme – 1:30
Flash Brothers - Sarcasm – 6:07
Cass - Mind Rewind – 6:54
Dirty Fours - Depth – 7:14
Guy Gerber & Sahar Z - Kenny's Back – 7:20
Orbital - Illuminate (Medicine Mix) – 5:49
Slacker - Looky Thing – 8:08

Disc two
FC Kahuna - Glitterball – 5:07
Infusion - Legacy (Synaesthesia Dub Mix) – 6:50
Hamel - Close (Evolution Mix) – 1:06
Sean Cusick - Consider the Ravens – 6:25
Natious - Magic Dust – 5:31
T-Empo - Fouk (Maurice & Noble Remix) – 7:42
Infusion - Starwater, It's Alright (Chicken Little Mix) – 4:31
Pin Drop - Corporate Entertainment – 10:47
Lostep - The Roots – 7:34
Ashland - Clear  – 4:48
Lamb - What Sound (Tom Middleton Deep Step Mix) – 7:17
Frakkar - Slide – 6:05

References

External links 

Global Underground
2002 compilation albums